The atrioventricular septum is a septum of the heart between the right atrium (RA) and the left ventricle (LV).

Although the name "atrioventricular septum" implies any septum between an atrium and a ventricle, in practice the divisions from RA to RV and from LA to LV are mediated by valves, not by septa. Also, there is usually no communication between the LA and the RV.

Structure
It has a membranous and muscular part.

When considering only the membranous septum, it is also known as the "atrioventricular component of the membranous septum".

Development
It is formed by the union of the dorsal AV cushion and ventral AV cushion. This septum divides the atrioventricular canal.

Clinical relevance
In some cases, defects can be identified with an echocardiogram.

Incomplete formation of the endocardial cushions can lead to atrioventricular septal defects, such as an ostium primum defect.

See also

References

External links
 https://web.archive.org/web/20091030081540/http://www.acc.org/membership/community/pediatric/opinion_apr03/Slide11.JPG

Cardiac anatomy